Kevin Randall (20 August 1945 – 28 March 2019) was an English footballer and manager. Randall joined up with Neil Warnock at Leeds in the Summer of 2012 having previously worked under Warnock as chief scout at Sheffield United, Crystal Palace and Q.P.R.

Randall died on 28 March 2019. His death was announced on the Twitter page of his former club, Chesterfield.

Managerial statistics

External links

References

1945 births
2019 deaths
Footballers from Ashton-under-Lyne
English footballers
Association football forwards
Bury F.C. players
Chesterfield F.C. players
Notts County F.C. players
Mansfield Town F.C. players
York City F.C. players
English Football League players
English football managers
York City F.C. managers
Chesterfield F.C. managers
English Football League managers
Sheffield United F.C. non-playing staff
Leeds United F.C. non-playing staff
Crystal Palace F.C. non-playing staff
Queens Park Rangers F.C. non-playing staff